Chalcosyrphus femoratus is a species of syrphid fly in the family Syrphidae.

Distribution
Canada, United States.

References

Eristalinae
Flies described in 1758
Diptera of North America
Taxa named by Carl Linnaeus